Rupani is an Indian name and it may refer to 
 Nanik Rupani, Indian Entrepreneur
 Vijay Rupani, Indian politician